David Nathan Saperstein is an American rabbi, lawyer, and Jewish community leader who served as United States Ambassador-at-Large for International Religious Freedom. He previously served as the director and chief legal counsel at the Union for Reform Judaism's Religious Action Center for more than 30 years.

Early life and education 
Saperstein was born in New York City. He earned a Bachelor of Arts degree from Cornell University, Master of Hebrew Letters from Hebrew Union College-Jewish Institute of Religion, and Juris Doctor from the Washington College of Law at American University.

Career 
Saperstein succeeded Rabbi Richard G. Hirsch as leader of the Washington D.C.-based political lobbying arm of the North American Reform movement. There, he advocated on a broad range of social justice issues. He directed a staff who provided extensive legislative and programmatic materials to synagogues, federations and Jewish Community Relations Councils nationwide, coordinating social action education programs that train nearly 3,000 Jewish adults, youth, rabbinic and lay leaders each year. He has been described as America's most influential rabbi.

On July 28, 2014, President Obama nominated Saperstein to be the first non-Christian to hold the post of United States Ambassador-at-Large for International Religious Freedom. In December 2014 Saperstein's appointment to the post won U.S. Senate confirmation.

He has co-chaired the Coalition to Preserve Religious Liberty, and serves on the boards of the NAACP, Common Cause, and People For the American Way. In 1999, Saperstein was elected as the first Chair of the U.S. Commission on International Religious Freedom.

On August 28, 2008, Saperstein delivered the invocation at the Democratic National Convention's final session, before Senator Barack Obama accepted the party's nomination for president.

In February 2009, he was named to President Obama's Council for Faith-Based and Neighborhood Partnerships. In 2009 Newsweek named him # 1 on its list of "50 Influential Rabbis."

Saperstein is also an adjunct professor at Georgetown University Law Center.

Personal
He is married to four-time Peabody Award winning journalist Ellen Weiss. They are the parents of musician Daniel Saperstein. His brother is Jewish Historian and Rabbi Marc Saperstein. Their parents were Rabbi Harold Saperstein and Marcia Saperstein.

He is a graduate member of the Tau Epsilon Phi fraternity.

See also
Religious Action Center

References

External links

Text of Rabbi Saperstein's invocation at the 2008 Democratic National Convention

1947 births
21st-century American rabbis
American Reform rabbis
Cornell University alumni
Tau Epsilon Phi
Living people
People for the American Way people
HuffPost writers and columnists
United States Ambassadors-at-Large